Dejan Koturović (Serbian Cyrillic: Дејан Котуровић; born 31 March 1972) is a retired Serbian professional basketball player.

Playing career

Europe
During his professional career, Koturović played for Spartak Subotica, Partizan, PSG Racing, Ülkerspor, Alba Berlin, Virtus Bologna and Tau Cerámica.

NBA
After winning gold at the 2002 FIBA World Championship, Koturović received interest from the Boston Celtics but they ended up signing Rubén Wolkowyski instead. Koturović then turned down an offer from the Toronto Raptors and signed for Virtus Bologna.

On 8 October 2003, Koturović signed a free-agent contract with the Phoenix Suns. He was planned as a temporary replacement for the injured Scott Williams. Koturović was waived on 24 October 2003 after Williams started healing faster than expected.

National team career
Koturović played for the national team of FR Yugoslavia/Serbia and Montenegro in three major tournaments: winning the gold medal at the 1995 FIBA European Championship and the 2002 FIBA World Championship and also featuring at the 2003 FIBA European Championship.

1995 EuroBasket 
As a young player on a star-studded team coached by Dušan Ivković, twenty-three-year-old Koturović did not get a lot of playing time at the 1995 FIBA European Championship where Yugoslavia went on to win gold.

2002 World Championship 
Koturović did not feature in any major international tournaments for seven years until the 2002 FIBA World Championship. Under coach Svetislav Pešić, Koturović featured in the starting lineup, shining in the semifinals against New Zealand where he led the team in scoring with 18 points. Yugoslavia went on to beat Argentina in the final with Koturović averaging 12.8 points, 7.1 rebounds and 1.1 blocks in the tournament.

2003 EuroBasket 
One year after winning the World Championship in Indianapolis, Koturović again answered the national team call-up, this time under the new Serbia and Montenegro banner at the 2003 FIBA European Championship in Sweden.

In mid August 2003, just weeks before the tournament, during an exhibition game against Greece, Koturović reportedly showed insubordination to coach Duško Vujošević for which Vujošević expelled him from the team and called up Đuro Ostojić as a replacement. This resulted in a public row between the two.

Vujošević and Koturović soon made up publicly with Koturović being reinstated in the team and eventually even making the final 12-man roster Vujošević took to the tournament. After losing to Russia, then beating outsiders Sweden, and losing to Spain in its 4-team preliminary round robin group, Serbia and Montenegro barely beat Turkey to make the quarterfinals where they lost to Lithuania. The team eventually placed sixth in the tournament, a result seen as disappointing in the country after two straight major tournament wins—EuroBasket 2001 and 2002 FIBA World Championship. The mending of fences between Vujošević and Koturović would prove only nominal as, right after the tournament ended, Koturović blasted Vujošević publicly for the team's disappointing result.

Personal life
In September 2014, Koturović was arrested at the Greece–Macedonia border trying to enter Macedonia with a used Honda CR-V vehicle he had purchased without awareness that it was stolen. In early October 2014, he was sentenced to three months in prison which he served in Macedonia. 

Koturović holds an Italian passport. In recent years, he has been a shamanic practitioner.

References

External links
 Dejan Koturović at acb.com
 Dejan Koturović at tblstat.net
 Dejan Koturović at legabasket.it
 Dejan Koturović at euroleague.net

1972 births
Living people
Alba Berlin players
Centers (basketball)
FIBA EuroBasket-winning players
KK Crvena zvezda youth players
KK Partizan players
KK Spartak Subotica players
Liga ACB players
Paris Racing Basket players
Saski Baskonia players
Serbian expatriate basketball people in France
Serbian expatriate basketball people in Germany
Serbian expatriate basketball people in Italy
Serbian expatriate basketball people in Spain
Serbian expatriate basketball people in Turkey
Serbian men's basketball players
Basketball players from Belgrade
Ülker G.S.K. basketball players
Virtus Bologna players
FIBA World Championship-winning players
2002 FIBA World Championship players